They'll Love Me When I'm Dead is a 2018 American documentary film, directed by Morgan Neville. It documents the ill-fated production of The Other Side of the Wind, directed by Orson Welles. The film had its world premiere at the Venice Film Festival on August 30, 2018. It was released on November 2, 2018, by Netflix.

Cast
Alan Cumming (narrator)
Peter Bogdanovich
Steve Ecclesine
Howard Grossman
Danny Huston
Oja Kodar
Rich Little
Frank Marshall
Cybill Shepherd
Beatrice Welles
Orson Welles

Production
In May 2017, it was announced Morgan Neville would direct a documentary film on the making of the Orson Welles' film The Other Side of the Wind. It was produced by Neville, Josh Karp, Korelan Matteson and Filip Jan Rymsza. Netflix distributed the film and it debuted on the streaming service on November 2, 2018.

Release
The documentary had its premieres at the Venice Film Festival and Telluride Film Festival on August 30, 2018. It was later screened at  New York Film Festival in October 2018. On November 1, 2018, it opened SFFILM's Doc Stories Film Series in San Francisco.

They'll Love Me When I'm Dead, which takes its name from a prophetic comment Welles made to Peter Bogdanovich, centers on Welles' return to the U.S. in the early 1970s to shoot his ill-fated Hollywood comeback film. The documentary concludes with his death in October 1985. "Welles is the protagonist of my documentary," Neville said. "[The Other Side of the Wind] is so autobiographical, even though he said it was not."

Critical reception
The website's critic consensus reads: "They'll Love Me When I'm Dead opens an entertaining window into the creative process – and late-period professional travails – of a brilliant filmmaker." Metacritic gives the film a weighted average score of 77 out of 100, based on 18 critics, indicating "generally favorable reviews."

References

External links
 

2018 films
American documentary films
Films directed by Morgan Neville
Netflix original documentary films
Documentary films about Orson Welles
Documentary films about films
2010s English-language films
2010s American films